War Room is a video game written by Robert S. Harris for the ColecoVision and published by Probe 2000 in 1983. The player takes the role of a four-star general defending the United States from a nuclear attack.

Reception
Tracie Forman of Electronic Games wrote, "It takes the concept introduced in Missile Command a giant step further," and called War Room "one of the most addictive, exhilarating games for the ColecoVision." In 2014, Retro Gamer included War Room in their Top Ten ColecoVision Games list.

References

1983 video games
ColecoVision games
ColecoVision-only games
Cold War video games
Shoot 'em ups
Video games developed in the United States